Thomas Cary may refer to:

Thomas Cary (North Carolina), Deputy Governor of the Province of Carolina 1705–1711, and leader of Cary's Rebellion
Thomas Cary or Thomas Kerry (MP) for Leominster (UK Parliament constituency)
Thomas Cary (publisher) of Quebec Mercury
Thomas Cary, High Sheriff of Somerset 1343-1353

See also
Thomas Carey (disambiguation)